Rekky is a social media platform that aggregates users’ photos and check-ins from Instagram, Facebook and Foursquare to provide users with venue recommendations based on where their friends have been. It is currently only available on iOS. Users log in with their social media accounts and their content will automatically pull from the sources.

Information
Users can also follow “tastemakers”. The platform currently includes The New Potato, Camille Becerra, Harley Viera-Newton and The Misshapes.

The app has been called competition for Yelp and has been described as a cross between Instagram and Foursquare.

References

Social media companies